TaxSlayer LLC (formerly known as TaxSlayer.com) is a privately held tax preparation and financial technology company based in Augusta, Georgia. The company offers online tax preparation technology for American consumers and tax professionals, allowing them to electronically file state and/or federal returns. TaxSlayer also offers business technology products and services for legal, bookkeeping and HR/payroll.

According to the National Association of Tax Professionals (NATP), TaxSlayer Pro is one of the top-rated software packages for tax professionals in the U.S. In 2015, the IRS awarded TaxSlayer with the exclusive contracts for its VITA and TCE programs, a five-year contract that provides electronic tax preparation assistance for taxpayers who are low-income, elderly, disabled or who have limited English language proficiency in over 9,500 locations worldwide. Over 90,000 tax preparers use TaxSlayer as part of the program.

In 2010, the company built its headquarters building in Evans, Georgia, a large suburb of metro Augusta. In 2017, the company purchased a building in Downtown Augusta’s Innovation Zone that will become its Innovation & Technology Campus and company headquarters in 2018. TaxSlayer plans to continue to operate from both buildings, refurbishing the Evans building as a dedicated operation unit known as the Customer Excellence Center. Between the two buildings, the company will be able to house 600 employees across the metro Augusta area.

The company is also known for its sports sponsorships, such as the TaxSlayer Bowl, a major college football bowl game in Jacksonville, Florida previously known as the Gator Bowl. Other sports sponsorships have included: Dale Earnhardt Jr., NASCAR and the JR Motorsports team, as well as three PGA Tour golfers.

History
In the early 1960s, Aubrey Rhodes, Sr. founded Rhodes-Murphy & Co., a full-service tax preparation company that remains in operation in Georgia and South Carolina. In 1989, the company formed a subsidiary, Rhodes Computer Services, to start developing tax preparation software for others to use.

Four years later, Rhodes Computer began selling taxation software known as "Taxslayer Pro" to tax preparers and accountants throughout the United States. TaxSlayer was named for the original email address of Jimmy Rhodes, son of Aubrey and the President and CEO at the time.

In 1998, the firm began developing TaxSlayer.com to market its software to individuals. TaxSlayer is now one of the largest online tax preparation services and a direct competitor to Intuit's TurboTax. In 2017, the company reported record growth in tax e-files with more than 10 million state and federal returns for the year, representing a 200% increase over the past three years.

Product offerings 
TaxSlayer produces software for several different market segments: consumers, professional tax preparers and the IRS VITA (Volunteer Income Tax Assistance) and TCE (Tax Counseling for the Elderly) program volunteers.

Consumer 
TaxSlayer’s consumer products allow taxpayers to electronically file their taxes online each year. The product provides several different packages to provide varying levels of assistance and support customers require when filling.

TaxSlayer Pro 
TaxSlayer Pro is designed to be licensed by members of tax preparation practices and small to mid-sized accounting firms.

Government partnerships

IRS VITA/TCE 
TaxSlayer maintains a continuing partnership with the Federal VITA and TCE programs. Both programs provide tax preparation assistance to Americans who may require assistance filing. VITA provides IRS-trained tax preparers who help those who are disabled, are low income, or limited in English proficiency, while TCE provides a similar service to the elderly. Both use TaxSlayer-provided software to aid them in their work.

Free File Alliance 
In addition to their paid offerings, TaxSlayer also participates in the IRS Free File Alliance, a nonprofit coalition of industry-leading tax software companies that partnered with the IRS to help millions of Americans prepare and e-file their federal tax returns for free. By participating in this program, TaxSlayer guarantees free preparation and e-filing to taxpayers who meet a set of income criteria.

Sports sponsorships

TaxSlayer Center 
The TaxSlayer Center is a 12,000-seat arena located in Moline, IL, of the Quad Cities region. The stadium is home to the Quad City Storm, a minor league professional hockey team, and the Quad City Steamwheelers of the Champions Indoor Football League. TaxSlayer purchased the naming rights to the stadium for a contract of more than $3.3 million over 10 years as part of a partnership enabling recreation and community in smaller cities, while promoting TaxSlayer’s brand in a burgeoning market.

College football

TaxSlayer is the title sponsor for the TaxSlayer Bowl, a college football bowl game held in Jacksonville, Florida. The game was previously known as the Gator Bowl and has been held continuously since 1946, making it the sixth oldest college bowl game. In 2014 the company struck a new six-year deal with Gator Bowl Sports to rename the bowl the TaxSlayer Bowl beginning in 2015.

In keeping with its support of the military, TaxSlayer also began the Honoring Our Heroes initiative, which donates thousands of tickets to the TaxSlayer Bowl to servicemembers and their families.

TaxSlayer.com has also been an associate sponsor of the Armed Forces Bowl and BBVA Compass Bowl.

NASCAR
TaxSlayer has been a primary sponsor of several top-tier NASCAR drivers, such as Bobby Labonte, Dale Earnhardt Jr. and Regan Smith.

Professional golf 
TaxSlayer sponsors PGA Tour golfers Patrick Reed, Henrik Norlander and Kevin Kisner.

References

External links 
 
 TaxSlayer IRS Free File Program

Financial services companies established in 1965
Tax software of the United States
Companies based in Augusta, Georgia